Criminal Investigation Agency (Bareskrim) is one of central executive agencies of Indonesian Police Force. Bareskrim conducts inquiries into a variety of criminal offences, initiates criminal investigations, identifies suspects, makes arrests, and is in charge of forensic laboratory. Officers from this unit wear civilian attire on duty.

Organisation

The organisation of Bareskrim consists of:

 Leadership Element
 Chief of Criminal Investigation Agency
 Vice Chief of Criminal Investigation Agency
 Auxiliary elements of leadership and Operational Staff
 Bureau of Development and Operation
 Bureau of Planning and Administration
 Bureau of Investigation Supervision
 Bureau of Coordination and Supervision of Civil Servants Investigator
 Special Executive Element
 Forensic Laboratory Centre
 Indonesia Automatic Fingerprint Identification System Centre
 National Criminal Information Centre
 Main Executive Element 
 Directorate of General Crime
 Directorate of Financial Crime
 Directorate of Corruption Crime
 Directorate of Narcotics Crime
 Directorate of Cyber Crime
 Directorate of Other-type of Crime, handles other type crime that is not covered by other directorate

Former Chiefs 

 Police Commissioner General Listyo Sigit Prabowo (promoted as Chief of National Police)
 Police Commissioner General (ret.) Idham Azis (then-promoted as Chief of National Police)
 Police Commissioner General Arief Sulistyanto (currently Chief of Security Preserving Body)
 Police Commissioner General (ret.) Ari Dono Sukmanto (then-promoted as Vice Chief of National Police)
 Police Commissioner General (ret.) Anang Iskandar
 Police Commissioner General (ret.) Budi Waseso
 Police Commissioner General (ret.) Suhardi Alius
 Police Commissioner General (ret.) Sutarman (then-promoted as Chief of National Police)
 Police Commissioner General (ret.) Ito Sumardi
 Police Commissioner General (ret.) Susno Duadji
 Police Commissioner General (ret.) Bambang Hendarso Danuri (then-promoted as Chief of National Police)

References

Specialist law enforcement agencies of Indonesia
Criminal investigation